John MacKenzie (28 July 1885 – 1940) was a Scottish professional footballer who made over 200 appearances as a left back for Southern League club Norwich City. He also played in the Scottish League for Heart of Midlothian and in the Football League for Walsall.

Personal life 
In December 1915, nearly 18 months since the outbreak of the First World War, MacKenzie enlisted as a gunner in the Royal Garrison Artillery. He saw service in Africa and was transferred to the Class Z Reserve in October 1919.

Career statistics

References 

Scottish footballers
Scottish Football League players
British Army personnel of World War I
Heart of Midlothian F.C. players
1885 births
Footballers from South Lanarkshire
Royal Garrison Artillery soldiers
Association football fullbacks
Carlisle United F.C. players
Norwich City F.C. players
Millwall F.C. players
Walsall F.C. players
English Football League players
Glenbuck Cherrypickers F.C. players
People from Douglas, South Lanarkshire
Military personnel from South Lanarkshire

1940 deaths
Southern Football League players